Wells Island is a bar island in Tyler County, West Virginia on the Ohio River. In 1891, the Board on Geographic Names officially decided upon Wells Island as the island's name. It lies to the southwest of Sistersville. Wells Island is protected as part of the Ohio River Islands National Wildlife Refuge.

See also 
List of islands of West Virginia

References

River islands of West Virginia
Islands of Tyler County, West Virginia
Islands of the Ohio River